The Rotunda (in its upper course also: Ungureni) is a right tributary of the river Lăpuș in Romania. It flows into the Lăpuș in Rogoz.

References

Rivers of Romania
Rivers of Maramureș County